Catocala concumbens, the sleepy underwing or pink underwing, is a moth of the family Erebidae. The species was first described by Francis Walker in 1858. It is found in eastern North America, west across the southern half of the Prairie Provinces to eastern Alberta.

The wingspan is 60–75 mm. Adults are on wing in August in one generation depending on the location.

The larvae feed on Populus and Salix species.

References

External links

"Catocala concumbens Walker 1858". Moths of North Dakota. Retrieved November 13, 2020.

concumbens
Moths of North America
Moths described in 1858